Małgorzata Jasińska (born 18 January 1984) is a Polish racing cyclist, who most recently rode for UCI Women's Continental Team .

Major results

2005
 2nd Road race, National Road Championships
 7th Overall Eko Tour Dookola Polski
2006
 9th Road race, UEC European Under-23 Road Championships
2007
 1st Copa Club Ciclista Callosino
 2nd Trofeo Ciudad de Sevilla
 4th Road race, National Road Championships
 4th Klomnice Road Race
 5th Overall Tour de Pologne Feminin
2008
 1st Dzierzoniów
 National Road Championships
2nd Road race
5th Time trial
 3rd Sobótka
 4th Majowy Wyscig Klasyczny – Lublin
 5th Górskie Mistrzostwa Polski
 6th Klasyczny-Naleczow
 6th Grudziadz
 7th Overall Wyscig Etapowy – Zamosc
2009
 1st  Road race, National Road Championships
2010
 1st  Road race, National Road Championships
 2nd Giornata del Ciclismo Rosa a Nove
 5th Eroica Rosa
 8th Overall Giro del Trentino Alto Adige-Südtirol
 8th Muri Fermani "Le Nostre Fiandre"
2011
 5th Road race, National Road Championships
2012
 1st  Overall Giro della Toscana Int. Femminile – Memorial Michela Fanini
1st  Mountains classification
1st Stage 2
 3rd Road race, National Road Championships
 6th Overall Trophée d'Or Féminin
 8th Overall Giro del Trentino Alto Adige-Südtirol
 8th GP Comune di Cornaredo
2013
 5th Team time trial, UCI Road World Championships
 7th Road race, National Road Championships
2014
 2nd Overall Giro della Toscana Int. Femminile — Memorial Michela Fanini
1st  Mountains classification
1st Stage 2
 National Road Championships
7th Time trial
9th Road race
 9th Overall Holland Ladies Tour
 9th Overall La Route de France
 10th Overall Trophée d'Or Féminin
 10th GP Comune di Cornaredo
2015
 National Road Championships
1st  Road race
4th Time trial
 1st  Overall Giro della Toscana Int. Femminile – Memorial Michela Fanini
1st  Mountains classification
1st Stage 2
 1st  Mountains classification Tour Cycliste Féminin International de l'Ardèche
 5th Giro dell'Emilia Internazionale Donne Elite
 7th SwissEver GP Cham-Hagendorn
2016
 1st Gran Prix San Luis Femenino
 2nd Overall Tour Femenino de San Luis
 National Road Championships
3rd  Road race
3rd Time trial
 4th Durango-Durango Emakumeen Saria
 5th Overall Giro della Toscana Int. Femminile – Memorial Michela Fanini
 9th Overall Emakumeen Euskal Bira
2017
 5th Time trial, National Road Championships
 8th Le Samyn des Dames
2018
 National Road Championships
1st  Road race
1st  Time trial
 2nd Grand Prix de Plumelec-Morbihan Dames
 2nd Veenendaal–Veenendaal Classic
 5th Road race, UCI Road World Championships
 6th Tour of Flanders for Women
 7th Dwars door Vlaanderen
 7th GP de Plouay – Bretagne
 8th Overall Thüringen Rundfahrt der Frauen
 8th Overall Belgium Tour
 10th Overall Emakumeen Euskal Bira
2019
 2nd Time trial, National Road Championships
 7th Le Samyn des Dames
 9th Overall The Women's Tour

References

External links
 
 

1984 births
Living people
Polish female cyclists
Sportspeople from Olsztyn
Cyclists at the 2016 Summer Olympics
Olympic cyclists of Poland
European Games competitors for Poland
Cyclists at the 2019 European Games